Meenakshi Goswami was an Indian actress who works mainly in Bengali cinema. mainly as supporting actress. She has worked in movies like Ogo Badhu Sundari, Dui Pata, Amar Geeti, Samrat O Sundari, Chhoto Bou, Swet Patharer Thala . She is particularly known for her popular dialogue delivery. Beside acting on films she has also directed a series of water ballet in the year 2000. She has also acted in Radio Drama and Television serials. She has directed television serial “Kolkatar Kache”.

Early life
Meenakshi Goswami was born on 21 May 1933 in Allahabad, Uttar Pradesh,   She studied at the Jagattaran Intermediate School in 1950 and later at the Allahabad University in the year 1954. She was a good athlete ( Volley ball Player and Swimmer ) in her younger days, She visited Russia for this purpose and was a member of Allahabad University Volley ball team. Later she joined peoples little theatre (PLT) in the year 1980, She learnt dancing from Sadhan Guha and Athinlal Ganguly.

Filmography

Television
 Ei Norodeha

References

External links 
 

1933 births
2012 deaths
Actresses in Bengali cinema
20th-century Indian actresses
University of Allahabad alumni
Bengali Hindus
Bengali theatre personalities
Indian stage actresses